Mishi Bakhshiev (born October 10, 1910 – 1972) was a Soviet writer and poet of Mountain Jew origin. He wrote in languages of the Mountain Jews (Juhuri) and Russian.

Biography
Bakhshiev was born in 1910, in the Southern Russian city of Derbent. In 1928 he was sent to study in Krasnodar, and then to Moscow. In 1936 he graduated from the State University of Farming. During the World War II, he was a war correspondent. He held various party positions, worked in leading positions in the newspaper "Dagestankaya Pravda".

In 1932, Bakhshiev wrote his first story "Towards a New Life." In 1933–1940 he wrote several collections of poems ("Komsomol", "Fruits of October"), novels (Juhuri:Э пушорехьи тозе зиндегуни) – "Towards a New Life", (Juhuri:Vetegechiho) –  "Fishermen" and dramas (Juhuri:Бесгуни игидхо) –  "Victory of the Hero", (Juhuri:Хори) – "Earth", as well as the musical comedy (Juhuri:Шох угли, шох Аббас ва-хомбол Хасан) – "Shah's son, Shah Abbas and the loader Hasan". 
In the postwar years, Bakhshiyev wrote a collection of poems (Juhuri:Ме хосденуьм васале) – "I love spring", which was published only after the death of the author. In 1962–1963 he wrote in (Juhuri:Хушахой онгур) – "A Bunch of Grapes", it was the first novel in the Mountain Jewish literature. 
Bakhshiev was also involved in translations from Russian into Juhuri. He translated Alexander Pushkin, Mikhail Lermontov and Nizami Ganjavi.

Some works of prose he wrote in Russian ("Stories about my fellow countrymen", 1956; "Common people", 1958; "Gardens will rustle", 1962, etc.) 
Bakhshiev's last play was Juhuri:Дю дедей) –  "Two Mothers", 1965.

External links
Mishi Bakhshiev
Judeo-Tat literature

References

1910 births
1972 deaths
People from Derbent
People from Makhachkala
Mountain Jews
Judeo-Tat poets
Judeo-Tat playwrights
Russian poets
Soviet poets
Soviet writers
Soviet male writers
Russian dramatists and playwrights
Russian male dramatists and playwrights
20th-century Russian male writers
Russian male poets
Soviet translators
Translators from Russian
20th-century Russian translators
Jewish Russian writers
Writers from Dagestan
Poets from Dagestan
Poets from Derbent
Writers from Derbent